Cincinnatier Freie Presse was a German-language newspaper based in Cincinnati, Ohio. It was founded in 1872 as the Cincinnati Courier, and in 1874 re-branded as the Cincinnati Freie Presse.   Tägliches Cincinnatier Volksblatt was absorbed into this paper after December 1919.  The paper became a weekly in 1941.

As of 1901, the paper published a separate evening edition (Abend Presse), Wednesday edition (Wochenblatt), and Sunday edition (Sonntagsblatt).

The paper's production ended in March, 1964.

References

Defunct newspapers published in Cincinnati
German-language newspapers published in Ohio